Glenea heptagona is a species of beetle in the family Cerambycidae. It was described by James Thomson in 1860.

References

heptagona
Beetles described in 1860